Donald Aronson (October 2, 1929 - April 17, 2019) was an American mathematician at the University of Minnesota.  He was an Elected Fellow of the American Mathematical Society.

References

Fellows of the American Mathematical Society
20th-century American mathematicians
21st-century American mathematicians
1929 births
2019 deaths